Ettore Ximenes (11 April 1855, Palermo  20 December 1926, Rome) was an Italian sculptor.

Biography

Son of Antonio Ximenes and Giulia Tolentino, a Sicilian noble woman, Ettore Ximenes initially embarked on literary studies but then took up sculpture and attended the courses at the Palermo Academy of Fine Arts. After 1872, he continued training at the Naples Academy under Domenico Morelli and Stanislao Lista. He also established a close relationship with Vincenzo Gemito.

He returned to Palermo in 1874 and won a competition for a four-year grant, which enabled him to study and open a studio for sculpture in Florence. In 1873 at Vienna, he exhibited Work without Genius. In 1877 at Naples, he exhibited a life-size statue titled The Equilibrium about a gymnast walking on a sphere. He would make copies of this work in small marble and bronze statuettes.

He exhibited a stucco Christ and the Adultress and Il cuore del re (Heart of the King), the latter depicting an oft-repeated story of King Vittorio Emanuele during one of his frequent hunts, encountering and offering charity to a peasant child. At the 1878 Paris World Exposition he displayed: The Brawl and il Marmiton. In Paris,  he met with Auguste Rodin and Jean-Baptiste Carpeaux.

In 1878, he also completed a life-size stucco of il Ciceruacchio, a statue of the Italian patriot Angelo Brunetti and his thirteen-year-old son, depicting them at the moment of their execution in 1849 by Austrian troops. The Cicervacchio statue, with its tinge of revolutionary zeal, did not find commissions for completing the work in marble.

He then completed a nude statue of Nanà based on the novel by Émile Zola; the statue was exhibited at the 1879 Salon di Paris. The next year at the Paris Salon, he displayed La Pesca meravigliosa, where a fisherman rescues a bathing maiden. Returning to Italy, he displayed the bust del minister Giuseppe Zanardelli. At the Mostra of Rome, he displayed The assassination of Julius Caesar; and at the Exposition of Venice, Ragazzi messi in fila. Ximenes' realism gave way to Symbolist and Neo-Renaissance elements. In addition to sculpture, he also produced illustrations for the works of Edmondo De Amicis published by the Treves publishing house.

Ximenes was involved in many of the major official monumental projects in Italy from the 1880s on and devoted his energies as from 1911 primarily to commissions for important public works in São Paulo, Kyiv, New York and Buenos Aires.

Works

In Italy
Bronze quadriga on Palace of Justice, Rome

In Ukraine
 Monument to Emperor Alexander II of Russia in Kyiv (1911)
 Monument to Pyotr Stolypin in Kyiv (1913)

In the United States
 Giovanni da Verrazzano in the Battery, Manhattan, New York, 1909
 Dante Alighieri in Dante Park at Lincoln Center, New York City and in Meridian Hill Park, Washington D.C. - castings of the same work, 1921

References

Bibliography
 Elena Lissoni, Ettore Ximenes, online catalogue Artgate by Fondazione Cariplo, 2010, CC BY-SA (source for biography).
 Dianne Durante, Outdoor Monuments of Manhattan: A Historical Guide (New York University Press, 2007), with a discussion of the Verrazzano.
Fried, Frederick & Edmund V. Gillon Jr., New York Civic Sculpture, Dover Publications, Inc., New York,  1976
Goode, James M., The Outdoor Sculpture of Washington D.C., Smithsonian Institution Press, Washington D.C.  1974
Lederer, Joseph & Arley Bondarin, All Around Town: A Walking Guide to Outdoor Sculpture in New York, Charles Scribner's Sons, New York,  1975
Mackay, James,The Dictionary of Sculptors in Bronze, Antique Collectors Club,  Woodbridge, Suffolk  1977

External links

 Artnet.com biography: Ettore Ximenes
 Flickr.com Ettore Ximenes Group

1855 births
1926 deaths
Artists from Palermo
20th-century Italian sculptors
20th-century Italian male artists
19th-century Italian sculptors
Italian male sculptors
19th-century Italian male artists